SS Perth, formerly SS Penola was a  steamship operated by the Adelaide Steamship Company. Penola was notable for ramming and sinking , a passenger steamship, in Port Phillip Bay on 19 November 1865. Renamed Perth, the steamship ran aground and was wrecked off Point Cloates in Western Australia on 17 September 1887.

See also
List of shipwrecks in 1887

References

Ships of South Australia
Steamships of Australia
Shipwrecks of Western Australia
Adelaide Steamship Company
1863 ships
Maritime incidents in September 1887